Lord Lambourne is an apple cultivar with a sweet sharp flavor. It was raised by Laxtons Brothers Ltd in 1907 in Bedford, England. Received a  Royal Horticultural Society Award of Merit in 1923.

Appearance and flavour 
The apple shape is broad globose conical, it has a distinctive orange blush mixed with a greenish yellow "background," and taste is sharp sweet.

Cultivation 
Lord Lambourne a mid season apple. It is sensitive to apple rubbery wood, apple chat fruit, apple canker, apple scab and honey fungus   but has some resistance to powdery mildew.

Descendant cultivars 

Prince Charles  (Lord Lambourne × Cox's Orange Pippin) 
Rubin  (Lord Lambourne × Golden Delicious) 
Karmen  (Lord Lambourne × Linda) 
Zlatava  (Lord Lambourne × Blahova Oranzova) 
Birgit Bonnier (Cortland × Lord Lambourne) 
Lady Lambourne  (Sport of Lord Lambourne) 
Russet Lambourne  (Sport of Lord Lambourne)

References

Apple cultivars
British apples